The LIBIS KB-6 Matajur was a 1950s  Slovenian two-seat light monoplane designed and produced by LIBIS aircraft during Yugoslavian period.

Design and development
The aircraft design office of LIBIS brought together teachers and students of the Ljubljana technical high school. The design office designed the KB-6 Matajur which was a two-seat light trainer and tourer that first flew on 4 June 1952. The KB-6 was a cantilever low-wing monoplane with fixed tailwheel landing gear and an enclosed cockpit with side-by-side seating and dual controls. The aircraft was produced for use in aero-clubs until the mid-1960s.

Variants
KB-6 Matajur
Main production variant, powered by a  Regnier 4L.00 inline engine.
KB-6T Matajur-Trised
Three-seat development powered by a  Walter Minor 6-III-J inline engine, eight built.
LIBIS 160
Further developed version of the KB-6T with swept vertical tail, 11 built.

Specifications (KB-6)

Notes

References
 
 
 

LIBIS aircraft